Sung Wan Kim (August 21, 1940 – February 24, 2020) was a South Korean-American academic who worked as a distinguished professor of pharmaceutics and pharmaceutical chemistry at the University of Utah. He is the founder and co-director of the University of Utah's Center for Controlled Chemical Delivery.

Early life and education
Kim was born in Pusan, South Korea. He received his B.S. and M.S. at Seoul National University in 1963 and 1965, respectively. In 1969, he received his PhD in physical chemistry at the University of Utah under Professor Henry Eyring.

Career 
Kim was considered a pioneer in the field of drug delivery. He was the founder of the International Symposium on Recent Advances in Drug Delivery, which is held biennially in Salt Lake City, Utah.

He was an elected member of the United States National Academies' Institute of Medicine (1999) and the National Academy of Engineering (2003). He was a Fellow in the American Association of Pharmaceutical Scientists, Biomaterials Society and American Institute for Medical and Biological Engineering.

Kim trained more than 100 scientists from 13 countries, had 25 patents and more than 550 publications. In addition to his contributions to academia, Dr. Kim was a successful entrepreneur. He was the founder of Expression Genetics, Inc., MacroMed, Inc. (Acquired by Protherics, Plc) and a co-founder of TheraTech, Inc. (Acquired by Watson Pharmaceuticals).

Personal life 
A naturalized U.S. citizen, Dr. Kim was married and had two children.

Awards
1987: Clemson Basic Biomaterials Award
Distinguished Research Award, University of Utah
1988: Utah Governor's Medal for Science and Technology
1995: Research Achievement Award in Drug Delivery, American Association of Pharmaceutical Scientists
Founders Award, Controlled Release Society
1996: Japanese Biomaterials Research Award
1998: Volwiler Award, American Association of Colleges of Pharmacy
2002: Dale Wurster Award, American Association of Pharmaceutical Scientists
2003: Ho-am Prize in Medicine, Rosenblatt Prize for Excellence
2006: honorary doctorate, Twente University
2014: Terumo Global Science Prize
He was awarded the Outstanding Paper in the Journal of Controlled Release three times, in 1989, 1991, and 1998.

References

External links
Sung Wan Kim's page at the University of Utah
Pharmaceutics, University of Utah

1940 births
2020 deaths
American pharmacologists
South Korean emigrants to the United States
Pharmaceutical scientists
Seoul National University alumni
University of Utah alumni
University of Utah faculty
Members of the United States National Academy of Engineering
Fellows of the American Institute for Medical and Biological Engineering
Members of the National Academy of Medicine
Recipients of the Ho-Am Prize in Medicine